Agnès Barthélémy is a French physicist. She is an expert on nanostructures. She is a professor at Université Paris-Sud and a member of the Institut Universitaire de France.

Education and career 
Agnès Barthélémy received her PhD in 1991 from Université Paris-Sud, where she worked under the supervision of Albert Fert.

Awards 

 2008: Prize “Louis Ancel” of the French Physical Society
 2010: CNRS silver medal
 2015: Prize Nikola Tesla
 2017: Prize Lazare Carnot of the Academy of Science

References 

Living people
Academic staff of Paris-Sud University
Year of birth missing (living people)
Place of birth missing (living people)
French physicists
French women physicists